Mesosa affinis is a species of beetle in the family Cerambycidae. It was described by Stephan von Breuning in 1936. It is known from Nepal and Bhutan.

Subspecies
 Mesosa affinis affinis Breuning, 1936
 Mesosa affinis nepalica Holzschuh, 2003

References

affinis
Beetles described in 1936